Louise Ringsing (born 20 August 1996) is a Danish footballer who plays as a midfielder for RB Leipzig and has appeared for the Denmark women's national under-23 team.

She has played for the Danish youth teams several times, but she hasn't made international debut for the Danish national team.

Club career
She started playing for Brøndby IF and Turbine Potsdam in her youth years. After two years in Germany, she went back to Brøndby IF until 2016 and then signed with Fortuna Hjørring. In 2018, she joined Bayer 04 Leverkusen, where she played in one year, until she came back to Denmark for Brøndby IF.

Personal life
Outside of football, Ringsing has studied to become a teacher.

References

External links
 
 
 
 Denmark player profile

1996 births
Living people
Danish women's footballers
Denmark women's international footballers
Brøndby IF (women) players
Women's association football midfielders
People from Faxe Municipality
Sportspeople from Region Zealand